Abū ʿAbd Allāh al-Mufaḍḍal ibn ʿUmar al-Juʿfī, died before 799, was an early Shi'i leader and the purported author of a number of religious and philosophical writings. A contemporary of the Imams Ja'far al-Sadiq (–765) and Musa al-Kazim (745–799), he belonged to those circles in Kufa whom later Twelver Shi'i authors would call  ('exaggerators') for their 'exaggerated' veneration of the Imams.

As a money-changer, al-Mufaddal wielded considerable financial and political power. He was likely also responsible for managing the financial affairs of the Imams in Medina. For a time he was a follower of the famous  leader Abu al-Khattab (died 755–6), who had claimed that the Imams were divine. Early Imami heresiographers and Nusayri sources regard al-Mufaddal as a staunch supporter of Abu al-Khattab's ideas who later spawned his own  movement (the ). However, Twelver Shi'i sources instead report that after Ja'far al-Sadiq's repudiated Abu al-Khattab in 748, al-Mufaddal broke with Abu al-Khattab and became a trusted companion of Ja'far's son Musa al-Kazim.

A number of writings—collectively known as the Mufaddal Tradition—have been attributed to al-Mufaddal, most of which are still extant. They were likely falsely attributed to al-Mufaddal by later 9th–11th-century authors. As one of the closest confidants of Ja'far al-Sadiq, al-Mufaddal was an attractive figure for authors of various Shi'i persuasions: by attributing their own ideas to him they could invest these ideas with the authority of the Imam. The writings attributed to al-Mufaddal are very different in nature and scope, but Ja'far al-Sadiq is the main speaker in most of them.

A recurring theme in these texts is the myth of the world's creation through the fall from grace of pre-existent "shadows" or human souls, whom God punished for their disobedience by concealing himself from them and by casting them down into the seven heavens. The  (Book of the Seven and the Shadows, 8th to 11th centuries) develops the theme of seven primordial Adams who rule over the seven heavens and initiate the seven historical world cycles. The  (Book of the Path, written –941) describes an initiatory "path" leading believers back through the seven heavens towards God. Those who grow in religious devotion and knowledge climb upwards on the chain of being, but others are reborn into human bodies, while unbelievers travel downwards and reincarnate into animal, vegetable, or mineral bodies.

Among the extant non- texts attributed to al-Mufaddal, most of which were preserved in the Twelver Shi'i tradition, two treatises stand out for their philosophical content. Both works may be regarded as part of an attempt to rehabilitate al-Mufaddal as a reliable transmitter of hadiths in the Twelver Shi'i tradition.

Life

Al-Mufaddal was a non-Arab  ("client") of the Ju'fa, a tribe belonging to the South-Arabian Madhhij confederation. Apart from the fact that he was a money-changer based in Kufa (Iraq), very little is known about his life. He probably managed the financial affairs of the Shi'ite Imams Ja'far al-Sadiq (–765) and Musa al-Kazim (745–799), who resided in Medina (Arabia). Using his professional network, he actively raised funds for the Imams in Medina, thus also playing an important role as an intermediary between the Imams and the Shi'ite community. His date of death is unknown, but he died before Musa al-Kazim, who died in 799.

At some point during his life, al-Mufaddal's relations with Ja'far al-Sadiq soured because of his adherence to the teachings of the Kufan  leader Abu al-Khattab (died 755–6). Abu al-Khattab had been a designated spokesman of Ja'far, but in  he was excommunicated by the Imam for his 'extremist' or 'exaggerated' ideas, particularly for having declared Ja'far to be divine.

This episode was understood in widely different ways by later Shi'i authors. It is not certain whether the  really ever existed, and if they did, whether they really held the doctrines attributed to them by the heresiographers. He was even accused in some hadith reports of having tried to contaminate Ja'far's eldest son Isma'il with the ideas of Abu al-Khattab.

On the other hand, later Twelver Shi'i sources often insist that al-Mufaddal never gave in to heresy, and they often emphasize that it was al-Mufaddal who was appointed by Ja'far to lead the  back to the right path. These works may have been written in order to rehabilitate al-Mufaddal within the Twelver tradition and to prove his reliability as a hadith transmitter. But even among Twelver scholars there was dissension. For example, while al-Shaykh al-Mufid (–1022) praised al-Mufaddal as a learned person and a trustworthy companion of the Imams, al-Najashi and Ibn al-Ghada'iri ( half of the 11th century) denounced him as an unbelieving heretic.

works

(Book of the Seven and the Shadows)

Content
It sets out in great detail the  myth of the pre-existent "shadows" whose fall from grace led to the creation of the material world.

This secret knowledge is entrusted by Ja'far to al-Mufaddal, but is reserved only for true believers. It involves notions such as the transmigration of souls ( or metempsychosis) and the idea that seven Adams exist in the seven heavens, each one of them presiding over one of the seven historical world cycles. This latter idea may reflect an influence from Isma'ilism, where the appearance of each new prophet (Adam, Noah, Abraham, Moses, Jesus, Muhammad, Muhammad ibn Isma'il) is likewise thought to initiate a new world cycle.

According to this myth, the first created beings were human souls who initially dwelt in the presence of God in the form of shadows. When the shadows disobeyed God, he created a veil in which he concealed himself as a punishment. Then God created the seven heavens as a dwelling place for the disobedient souls, according to their sin. In each of the heavens God also created bodies from his own light for the souls who arrived there, and from the souls' disobedience he created the Devil. Finally, from the offspring of the Devil God created the bodies of animals and various other sublunary entities.

Composition and legacy
The  consists of at least eleven different textual layers which were added over time, each of them containing slightly different versions of  concepts and ideas. The earliest layers were written in 8th/9th-century Kufa, perhaps partly by al-Mufaddal himself, or by his close associates Yunus ibn Zabyan and Muhammad ibn Sinan (died 835). In total, at least three works closely related to al-Mufaddal's  are extant, all likely dating to the 8th or 9th century:

Muhammad ibn Sinan's  (Book of the Lights and the Veils)

The Nusayris were probably also responsible for the work's final 11th-century form.

(Book of the Path)

The  (Book of the Path) is another purported dialogue between al-Mufaddal and Ja'far al-Sadiq, likely composed in the period between the Minor and the Major Occultation (874–941). This work deals with the concept of an initiatory "path" leading the adept on a heavenly ascent towards God, with each of the seven heavens corresponding to one of seven degrees of spiritual perfection.

The philosophical background of the work is given by the late antique concept of a great chain of being linking all things together in one great cosmic hierarchy. This hierarchical system extends from the upper world of spirit and light (populated by angels and other pure souls) to the lower world of matter and darkness (populated by humans, and below them animals, plants and minerals). Humanity is perceived as taking a middle position in this hierarchy, being located at the top of the world of darkness and at the bottom of the world of light. Those human beings who lack the proper religious knowledge and belief are reborn into other human bodies, which are likened to 'shirts' (sing. ) that a soul can put on and off again. But grave sinners are reborn instead into animal bodies, and the worst offenders are reborn into the bodies of plants or minerals. On the other hand, those believers who perform good works and advance in knowledge also travel upwards on the ladder, putting on ever more pure and luminous 'shirts' or bodies, ultimately reaching the realm of the divine. This upwards path is represented as consisting of seven stages above that of humanity, each located in one of the seven heavens:

: the Tested, first heaven
: the Devout, second heaven
: the Elect, third heaven
: the Noble, fourth heaven
: the Chief, fifth heaven
: the Unique, sixth heaven
: the Gate, seventh heaven

At every degree the initiate receives the chance to gain a new level of 'hidden' or 'occult' knowledge. If the initiate succeeds at internalizing this knowledge, they may ascend to the next degree. If, however, they lose interest or start to doubt the knowledge already acquired, they may lose their pure and luminous "shirt", receiving instead a heavier and darker one, and descend down the scale of being again. Most notably, they are able to manifest themselves to ordinary beings in the world of matter, by taking on the form of a human and appearing to anyone at will. This ability is shared between the "Gates" in the seventh heaven and God, who also manifests himself to the world by taking on a human form.

The theme of a heavenly ascent through seven degrees of spiritual perfection is also explored in other  works, including the anonymous  (Book of Degrees and Stages), as well as various works attributed to Muhammad ibn Sinan (died 835), Ibn Nusayr (died after 868), and others. These fifthy-five degrees correspond to the fifthy-five celestial spheres alluded to by Plato in his Timaeus and mentioned by Aristotle in his Metaphysics.

Other  works

 (Mufaddali Epistle) is a brief dialogue between al-Mufaddal and Ja'far al-Sadiq of unclear date and origin. Its main subject is the classical theological question of the relationship between the one transcendent God on the one hand, and his many attributes and names on the other.

 (What Will Happen at the Appearance of the Mahdi) is a lengthy apocalyptic text about the state of the world during the end times, just before the return of the Mahdi. Its earliest known version is preserved in a work by the Nusayri author al-Khasibi (died 969), but the text likely goes back to the 9th century and perhaps even to al-Mufaddal himself. Though mainly dealing with the actions that the Mahdi will undertake to render justice to the oppressed, the work also contains references to mainstream Shi'i ideas such as temporary marriage contracts, as well as to the  idea of world cycles.

It was preserved by the Imami (i.e., proto-Twelver) scholar al-Saffar al-Qummi (died 903). It also contains a reference to the obscure idea, likewise found in the  but attributed here to Abu al-Khattab (died 755–6), that religious commandments and restrictions are 'men', and that to know these 'men' is to know religion.

Mu'tazili-influenced works
Though both were preserved by the 17th-century Shi'i scholar Muhammad Baqir al-Majlisi (died 1699), the only element connecting them to Shi'ism is their ascription to Ja'far al-Sadiq and al-Mufaddal. Their content appears to be influenced by Mu'tazilism, a rationalistic school of Islamic speculative theology. Often transmitted together in the manuscript tradition, they may be regarded as part of an attempt to rehabilitate al-Mufaddal among Twelver Shi'is, to whom al-Mufaddal was important as a narrator of numerous hadiths from the Imams Ja'far al-Sadiq and his son Musa al-Kazim. Both works were also known to other Twelver scholars such as al-Najashi (–1058), Ibn Shahrashub (died 1192), and Ibn Tawus (1193–1266).

(al-Mufaddal's )

The  sets out to prove the existence of God based on the argument from design (also called the teleological argument). The work consists of a series of lectures about the existence and oneness of God presented to al-Mufaddal by Ja'far al-Sadiq, who is answering a challenge made to him by the self-declared atheist Ibn Abi al-Awja'. In four "sessions", Ja'far argues that the cosmic order and harmony which can be detected throughout nature necessitates the existence of a wise and providential creator.

The  is not an original work. Instead, it is a revised version of a work also attributed to the famous Mu'tazili litterateur al-Jahiz (died 868) under the title  (Book on the Proofs and Contemplation of Creation and Administration). The attribution of this work to al-Jahiz is probably spurious as well, although the original was likely written in the 9th century. Compared to pseudo-Jahiz's , the  adds an introduction that sets up a frame story involving al-Mufaddal, Ibn Abi al-Awja', and Ja'far al-Sadiq, as well rhymed praises of God at the beginning of each chapter, and a brief concluding passage.

Scholars have espoused various views on the ultimate origins of this work. According to Melhem Chokr, the versions attributed to al-Mufaddal and to al-Jahiz are both based on an unknown earlier work, with the version attributed to al-Mufaddal being more faithful to the original. In Chokr's view, at some point the work must have been translated by a Syriac author into the Arabic from a Greek original, perhaps from an unknown Hermetic work.

The / contains many parallels with Syriac Christian literature, especially with the commentaries on the Hexameron (the six days of creation as described in Genesis) written by Jacob of Edessa (–708) and Moses bar Kepha (–903), as well as with Job of Edessa's encyclopedic work on natural philosophy called the Book of Treasures. Its teleological proof of the existence of God—based upon a discussion of the four elements, minerals, plants, animals, meteorology, and the human being—was likely inspired by pseudo-Aristotle's  (On the Universe, 3rd/2nd century BCE), a work also used by the Syriac authors mentioned above. In particular, the / contains the same emphasis on the idea that God, who already in pseudo-Aristotle's  is called "one", can only be known through the wisdom permeating his creative works, while his own essence remains hidden for all.

The idea that contemplating the works of nature leads to a knowledge of God is also found in the Quran. However, in the case of the /, the idea is set in a philosophical framework that clearly goes back on Hellenistic models. Apart from pseudo-Aristotle's  (3rd/2nd century BCE), there are also many parallels with Cicero's (106–43 BCE) , especially with the Stoic views on teleology and divine providence outlined in Cicero's work. Some of the enemies cited in the work are Diagoras (5th century BCE) and Epicurus (341–270 BCE), both reviled since late antiquity for their alleged atheism, as well as Mani (–274 or 277 CE, the founding prophet of Manichaeism), a certain Dūsī, and all those who would deny the providence and purposefulness of God.

(Book of the Myrobalan Fruit)
The  (Book of the Myrobalan Fruit) is another work in which al-Mufaddal asks Ja'far al-Sadiq to present a proof of the existence and oneness of God in response to those who openly profess atheism. In the epistle itself, the author (presumed to be Ja'far al-Sadiq) recounts his meeting with an Indian physician, who contended that the world is eternal and therefore does not need a creator. Taking the myrobalan fruit (perhaps the black myrobalan or Terminalia reticulata, a plant used in Ayurveda) that the Indian physician was grinding as a starting point for contemplation, the author of the epistle succeeds in convincing the physician of the existence of God. The dialectical style of the debate is typical of early Muslim speculative theology. Sciences like astrology and medicine are presented as originating from divine revelation.

Other works
Some other works attributed to, or transmitted by, al-Mufaddal are still extant:
The  (Testament of al-Mufaddal) is a short text purporting to be al-Mufaddal's testament to the Shi'is of Kufa. The testament itself only contains a rather generic exhortation to piety and proper religious conduct, but it is followed by a paragraph in which Ja'far al-Sadiq reproaches the Kufan Shi'is for their hostility towards al-Mufaddal, exonerating his disciple from all blame. The text may very well be authentic, though it may also have been attributed to al-Mufaddal by later authors seeking to rehabilitate him.
It is a revised version of an originally Talmudic invocation that was used by Jews to cast off robbers and thieves. It was apparently in use among Muslims during the time of Muhammad ibn Uthman al-Amri, who approved of this practice but claimed to possess a "fuller" version handed down from the Imam Ja'far al-Sadiq. This version is nearly identical to the version preserved in the Talmud, only adding the names of the prophet Muhammad and some of his family members. 
The  is treatise attributed to al-Mufaddal on the virtue of rice.
 (Ja'farian Aphorisms) is a collection of moral aphorisms attributed to Ja'far al-Sadiq and transmitted by al-Mufaddal.

There are also some works attributed to, or transmitted by, al-Mufaddal that are mentioned in other sources but are now lost:
 (Book of the Causes of Religious Laws)
 (Book of Day and Night)
 (Book), a notebook containing hadiths purportedly recorded by al-Mufaddal

Notes

References

Bibliography

Tertiary sources

Secondary sources

 (reprinted in )

Primary sources

 (pp. 196–198 contain a critical edition of chapter 59)

 (edition based on a different ms. compared to )

Other

 ( in vol. 3, pp. 57–151;  in vol. 3, pp. 152–198;  in vol. 53, pp. 1–38)

Ghulat leaders
8th-century Islamic religious leaders
People from Kufa
Year of birth unknown
Year of death unknown
8th-century Shia Muslims